ABS-CBNnews.com is a news website based in Quezon City, Philippines. It is owned by the media conglomerate ABS-CBN Corporation and it is predominantly targeted to the Filipino market. The website is maintained by the ABS-CBN Digital Media division of ABS-CBN while its contents are provided by ABS-CBN News and The Philippine Star. Aside from the website interface, users can also access its contents through its mobile app available in both iOS, android and Windows. The ABS-CBNnews.com app is also available on LG Smart TV. Although the domain address of the website was absorbed to the ABS-CBN.com website, it still retains the original logo. On the other hand, the old url redirects the user to the current domain.

It is currently the top news website in the Philippines based on Alexa rankings and among the biggest Facebook publisher in the world according to NewsWhip. Its YouTube channel on the other hand has over two million subscribers and over one billion views, while its Twitter account has over two million followers.

References

External links
Media Ownership Monitor Philippines – Online by VERA Files and Reporters Without Borders

ABS-CBN Digital Media
Philippine news websites
Asian news websites
Assets owned by ABS-CBN Corporation